Tian Zhen (born 2 May 1966) is a Chinese rock singer from Beijing.

Early life 
On May 2, 1966, Tian Zhen was born in Beijing to Dai Li and Tian Zhenhua. Both of her parents were members of the army — her father as a soldier, and her mother as a solo singer. Tian is the youngest of four children, with three elder brothers.

Tian is an alum of The Affiliated High School of Peking University.

Career 
She has described Tina Turner as her favorite singer. Unlike her female Chinese vocalist predecessors, she writes and composes her own songs.

Tian is regarded as one of the three greatest female singers of her generation, along with Mao Amin and Na Ying. Tian's hits include Perseverance (执着), Cheers, Mate (干杯，朋友), What a big tree (好大一棵树), The girl from Ali Mountain (阿里山的姑娘), Night Stand (水姻缘), and Roses in the storms and rainbows (风雨彩虹铿锵玫瑰).

Personal life 
Tian married her manager Zhang Weining. They have no children.

Tian suffered from thrombocytopenia, a serious blood disease around 2006.

Discography 
 1984 Beautiful Bay (美丽的海湾; Měilì de Hǎiwān)
 1984 Nameless Little Flower (无名的小花; Wúmíng de Xiǎohuā)
 1984 Monica (莫尼卡; Mòníkǎ)
 1995 Perseverance (执着; Zhízhuó)
 1996 Self-titled Tian Zhen (田震;Tián Zhèn)
 1997 Let it Be (顺其自然; Shùn qí Zìrán)
 1998 Cheers, Mate (干杯，朋友; GānBēi PéngYǒu)
 2000 Shock (震撼; Zhènhàn)
 2001 Night Stand (水姻缘; Shuǐ yīnyuán)
 2005 38.5 ºC 
 2006 Thanks Tian (干杯，田震; Gānbēi, tiánzhèn)

Related artists/bands
 Cui Jian
 Dou Wei
 Tang Dynasty (band)

References

External links 
 Official site

 
|-
! colspan="3" style="background: #DAA520;" | Top Chinese Music Chart Awards
|-

1966 births
Living people
Chinese women singer-songwriters
Chinese rock singers
Chinese Mandopop singers
Singers from Beijing
Writers from Beijing
20th-century Chinese women singers
21st-century Chinese women singers